The Sale & Altrincham Messenger was a weekly newspaper for Sale, Altrincham and their surroundings in the Metropolitan Borough of Trafford in Greater Manchester, England. It was one of two sister Newsquest publications alongside the Stretford & Urmston Messenger. These two publications merged at the start of 2018 to form The Messenger.

References

Citations

Newspapers published by Newsquest